Phoenice or Phoenike was an ancient Greek city in Epirus and capital of the Chaonians. It was also the location of the Treaty of Phoenice which ended the First Macedonian War, as well as one of the wealthiest cities in Epirus until the Roman conquest. During the early Byzantine period, Phoenice was the see of a bishopric. The city is an archaeological park of Albania and is located on a hill above a modern town which bears the same name, Finiq, in modern southern Albania.

Toponym
The toponym is ultimately of non-Indo-European origin, as with all names with an -īk suffix in IE languages. There were at least 16 toponyms throughout the Ancient Greek world sharing the root Phoinik-; from Epirus to Lycia.  In ancient Greek, φοῖνιξ (phoenix) may have acquired different meanings. They include "dark red or "brown-red", which could have referred to geographical features of particular rivers and mountains. As a name it may have referred to groups which entered the Aegean sea via the southern Anatolian coastline.

History

Antiquity
The city was the political center of the Chaonians, one of the three major Greek tribes in ancient Epirus. From the second half of the 5th century BC, an acropolis was erected, which hosted a number of public buildings, while at the end of the next century the fortifications of the city were expanded as part of the defensive strategy of Pyrrhus, leader of united Epirus. The patron god of the city was probably Athena Polias. The walls of Phoenice consisted of massive blocks up to 3.60 meters thick, the Chaonians' primary concern being to defend the city against Corcyraeans or Illyrian raiders. In circa 233 BC, Queen Deidamia II, the last member of the Aeacid ruling dynasty, was assassinated, the monarchy was abolished in Epirus, and the city became the center of the federal government of the Epirote League.

In 231 BC, an Illyrian army of Queen Teuta, returning north from a raid in the Peloponnese, captured Phoenice after the town was surrendered by the 800 Gaulish mercenary garrison. An army was sent by the Epirote League to relieve the town, but the Illyrians were forced to withdraw their troops to deal with an internal rebellion. A truce was thus reached, and Phoenice and the Illyrians' free-born captives were returned to the Epirotes for a ransom. During their occupation of Phoenice, the Illyrians murdered several Roman merchants in the town, which would eventually lead to the First Illyrian War. In 205 BC, a peace treaty was signed there between the Kingdom of Macedon and the Roman Republic that ended the First Macedonian War. During the Third Macedonian War (171 BC–168 BC), Epirus was split into two states with the Molossians siding with the Macedonians and the Chaonians and Thesprotians siding with Rome. The latter were centered in Phoenice under the leadership of Charops. After the Roman conquest (167 BC), the region of Epirus was devastated except for the pro-Roman supporters in Chaonia. During the following centuries, Phoenice and nearby Antigoneia did not reveal strong traces of Roman presence.

Medieval period
In the early Byzantine era, Emperor Justinian I (r. 527–565) constructed fortifications on a hill adjacent to Phoenice. During the 5th and 6th centuries, the city was listed as a see of a bishopric and hosted a number of religious buildings including a baptistery and a basilica, which were influenced by the architectural style of the great basilicas of Nikopolis. Phoenice was one of the main settlements in Epirus Vetus together with Nicopolis, Dodona, Euroia, Andrianoupolis, Anhiasmos, Vouthroton, Photike, Corfu and Ithaka. However, the city vanished after the 6th century and the urban center of the area moved to nearby Mesopotamon.

20th century excavations

Formal excavations in the area started in 1924 by an Italian Archaeological Mission as a political tool for Mussolini's nationalistic ambitions to the east of the Adriatic. During 1924–1928, French and Italian archaeologists found a few artifacts in Phoenice. In fact, the Italian mission headed by the fascist prehistorian, Luigi Ugolini, hoped that the prehistoric graves that would be discovered could be attributed to the Illyrians in order exploit Albanian nationalist sentiment, but the finds themselves were hardly stunning. Ugolini also stated that materials found there were related to the Iron Age culture of southern Italy. Ugolini's thesis was later politically exploited by the totalitarian regime of Fascist Italy.

After 1928, excavations moved to the nearby archaeological sites of Kalivo and Çuka e Aitoit (or Mount Eagle) and continued until 1943. After the war, excavations resumed in 1958 by a joint Albanian-USSR archaeological team, which included a thorough topographic survey and mapping. After 1961, when a political rift occurred between Albania and the USSR, excavations continued under Albanian authorities. A complete report of these excavations has not been published. Some parts of the work were published by Albanian archaeologists Bace and Bushati in 1989, reporting Hellenistic domiciles, Roman houses, and other finds dating from the 4th century BC to the 4th century AD. The authors identified three distinct structures, it has been suggested
by them that this whole complex comprised a Prytaneion, serving visitors to the town, outside the principal enceinte. Those Albanian archaeologists found also the opportunity to strengthen the nationalistic paradigm of Illyrian-Albanian continuity by reporting similarities of these houses and the medieval Albanian ones. They also found an "egalitarian" nature among the excavated dwellings, in line with the philosophy of communist "self-reliance" promoted by the Albanian state during that period.

2012 looting incident
In June 2012, looters broke into a Hellenistic-era tomb located on the road that connected Phoenice to its hinterland. The looters reportedly used heavy construction equipment to dig a trench several meters deep through the hillside, scattering the stones of the tomb in the process. Looting of archeological sites remains a widespread problem in Albania.

See also
List of cities in ancient Epirus
Treaty of Phoenice

References

Citations

Sources

External links

Italian Excavation Mission in Phoenice

Chaonia
Cities in ancient Epirus
Populated places in ancient Epirus
Ancient Greek archaeological sites in Albania
Populated places of the Byzantine Empire
Medieval Epirus
Albania in the Roman era
Roman sites in Albania
Buildings and structures in Vlorë County
Former populated places in Albania